Michael Learns to Rock is the sixth studio album by Danish soft rock band Michael Learns to Rock. It was released on February 9, 2004, by Medley Records (EMI). The album was re-titled Take Me to Your Heart in Asia.

In Denmark, "Frostbite" was released as the lead single in 2003, followed by "Final Destination" and "Salvation". Michael Learns to Rock performed "Frostbite" and "Final Destination" at Dansk Melodi Grand Prix 2004 on February 7, 2004. The album's lead single in Asia, "Take Me to Your Heart", was released in 2004 and is an adaptation of the 1993 Chinese hit "Goodbye Kiss" by Jacky Cheung. The name of the original song is "吻别" ("Wen Bie").

Track listing

Charts

References

2004 albums
Michael Learns to Rock albums